Veer Singh Mehta (born 5 December 1949 in Rajasthan, India), is a notable Indian neurosurgeon . He received his education and training at SMS Medical College Jaipur and later at AIIMS. Mehta is a pioneer in surgery for brachial plexus injuries in India and is an elected fellow of the National Academy of Medical Sciences.He was elected as the president of the Neurological Society and as the President of the South Asian Neurosurgeons. He is renowned worldwide for his work in the field of Brain Stem Surgery, Brachial Plexus Surgery, Aneurysms and Spinal Tumor Surgery. He is well known Brain Tumor Surgeon in India and has treated numerous Indian and International patient all across the globe for Brain disorders.  The Government of India awarded him Padma Shri in 2005. Noted neurosurgeon B. K. Misra was his junior at AIIMS Delhi.

References

Medical doctors from Rajasthan
Recipients of the Padma Shri in medicine
Rajasthani people
Indian neurosurgeons
1949 births
Living people
Fellows of the National Academy of Medical Sciences
20th-century Indian medical doctors
20th-century surgeons